This is a list of 109 species in Pachytychius, a genus of true weevils in the family Curculionidae.

Pachytychius species

 Pachytychius abeillei Desbrochers, 1892 c
 Pachytychius aethiopicus Caldara, 2000 c
 Pachytychius albomaculatus Pic, 1905 c
 Pachytychius albosparsus Caldara, 1989 c
 Pachytychius alepensis Hoffmann, 1958 c
 Pachytychius amoenus Leconte, 1876 c
 Pachytychius ancora Tournier, 1873 c
 Pachytychius antoinei Hoffmann, 1944 c
 Pachytychius aridicola Caldara, 1984 c
 Pachytychius asperatus Bedel, 1884 c
 Pachytychius auricollis Tournier, 1873 c
 Pachytychius avulsus Faust, 1885 c
 Pachytychius baeticus Kirsch, 1870 c
 Pachytychius basimaculata Voss, 1964 c
 Pachytychius beardae Caldara, 2000 c
 Pachytychius bedeli Chevrolat, 1881 c
 Pachytychius behnei Caldara, 1988 c
 Pachytychius bifascithorax Escalera, 1914 c
 Pachytychius bugnioni Stierlin, 1894 c
 Pachytychius cognatus Caldara, 2000 c
 Pachytychius congoanus Hustache, 1923 c
 Pachytychius curvirostris Hoffmann, 1944 c
 Pachytychius deplanatus Desbrochers, 1898 c
 Pachytychius difficilis Caldara, 1978 c
 Pachytychius discithorax Desbrochers, 1873 c
 Pachytychius discoideus Leconte, 1876 c
 Pachytychius echidna Caldara, 1978 c
 Pachytychius eldae Caldara, 1978 c
 Pachytychius elephas Kraatz, 1862 c
 Pachytychius erythreensis Hustache, 1932 c
 Pachytychius erythropterus Chevrolat, 1879 c
 Pachytychius fairmairei Tournier, 1873 c
 Pachytychius grandicollis Caldara, 2010 c
 Pachytychius granicollis Reitter, 1883 c
 Pachytychius granulicollis Tournier, 1874 c
 Pachytychius haematocephalus (Gyllenhal, 1836) i c b  (gilkicker weevil)
 Pachytychius hierosolymus Desbrochers, 1900 c
 Pachytychius hirtipes Hustache, 1939 c
 Pachytychius hirtulus Chevrolat, 1879 c
 Pachytychius hispidulus Solari, 1932 c
 Pachytychius hypocrita Tournier, 1873 c
 Pachytychius illectus Faust, 1889 c
 Pachytychius indicus Tournier, 1873 c
 Pachytychius insularis Chevrolat, 1875 c
 Pachytychius jakobsoni Legalov, 2007 c
 Pachytychius kirschi Tournier, 1873 c
 Pachytychius krugeri Solari, 1939 c
 Pachytychius lacordairei Tournier, 1873 c
 Pachytychius laticollis Desbrochers, 1898 c
 Pachytychius latithorax Pic, 1902 c
 Pachytychius latus Jekel, 1861 c
 Pachytychius letourneuxi Desbrochers, 1891 c
 Pachytychius leucoloma Jekel, H., 1861 c
 Pachytychius lineipennis Klima, 1934 c
 Pachytychius longipilis Reitter, 1909 c
 Pachytychius lostiae Solari, 1939 c
 Pachytychius lucasi Jekel, 1861 c
 Pachytychius lyali Caldara, 2000 c
 Pachytychius maculosus Klima, 1934 c g
 Pachytychius marmoreus Desbrochers, 1895 c
 Pachytychius mazaganicus Escalera, 1914 c
 Pachytychius melillensis Escalera, 1914 c
 Pachytychius mungonis Marshall, 1915 c
 Pachytychius nivalis Korotyaev, 1987 c
 Pachytychius oberprieleri Caldara, 2000 c
 Pachytychius obscuricollis Voss, 1960 c
 Pachytychius obsoletus Desbrochers, 1898 c
 Pachytychius pachyderus Fairmaire, 1870 c
 Pachytychius pardoi Hoffmann, 1952 c
 Pachytychius phytonomoides Escalera, 1914 c
 Pachytychius picteti Tournier, 1873 c
 Pachytychius puncticollis Reitter, 1873 c
 Pachytychius quadrifasciatipennis Escalera, 1914 c
 Pachytychius rifensis Hustache, 1936 c
 Pachytychius robustus Wollaston, 1854 c
 Pachytychius rotroui Pic, 1925 c
 Pachytychius rotundicollis Desbrochers, 1896 c
 Pachytychius rubriceps Rosenhauer, 1856 c
 Pachytychius scabricollis Rosenhauer, 1856 c
 Pachytychius schusteri Reitter, 1909 c
 Pachytychius scrobiculatus Rosenhauer, 1856 c
 Pachytychius sellatus (Lucas, H., 1846) c g
 Pachytychius setosus Marshall, 1950 c
 Pachytychius siculus Desbrochers, 1891 c
 Pachytychius simillimus Desbrochers, 1891 c
 Pachytychius simulans Caldara, 2010 c
 Pachytychius sinaiticus Caldara, 2010 c
 Pachytychius smyrnensis Desbrochers, 1891 c
 Pachytychius sobrinus Tournier, 1873 c
 Pachytychius solidus Faust, 1885 c
 Pachytychius sparsutus Jekel, 1861 c
 Pachytychius squamosus Acloque, 1896 c
 Pachytychius striatellus Caldara, 2000 c
 Pachytychius strumarius Tournier, 1873 c
 Pachytychius subasper Fairmaire, 1870 c
 Pachytychius subcordatus Desbrochers, 1894 c
 Pachytychius subcostatus Kol., 1858 c
 Pachytychius subcylindricus Reitter, 1890 c
 Pachytychius summorum Peyerimhoff, 1943 c
 Pachytychius talgarensis Legalov, 2007 c
 Pachytychius transcaucasicus Pic, 1913 c
 Pachytychius transmutatus Voss, 1962 c
 Pachytychius transversicollis Fairmaire, 1877 c
 Pachytychius trapezicollis Tournier, 1873 c
 Pachytychius trimacula Rosenhauer, 1856 c
 Pachytychius tuberculatus Caldara, 2000 c
 Pachytychius tychioides Desbrochers, 1900 c
 Pachytychius undulatus Desbrochers, 1873 c
 Pachytychius viciae Marshall, 1938 c

Data sources: i = ITIS, c = Catalogue of Life, g = GBIF, b = Bugguide.net

References

Pachytychius
Articles created by Qbugbot